The Nyikina people (also spelt Nyigina and Nyikena, and listed as Njikena by Tindale) are an Aboriginal Australian people of the Kimberley region of Western Australia.

They come from the lower Fitzroy River (which they call mardoowarra).

Language
The Nyigina language is one of several eastern varieties of the Nyulnyulan languages, closely related to Warrwa and Yawuru. It is still (2012) spoken by around 10 people.

Education
The Nyigina, together with the Mangala people, run the Nyikina Mangala Community School a school at Jarlmadangah in West Kimberley. The Nyigina-Mangala peoples also run another school, together with the Walmajarri, at Looma.

Native title
In 1998 the Nyigina people undertook legal proceedings to pursue their native title claims. One consisted of a Nyikina Mangala claim, which they shared with the Mangala while the other comprised the Nyikina- Warrwa pursued together with the closely related Warrwa people. The Shire of Derby settled an Indigenous land use agreement with the Indigenous plaintiffs, regarding the Nikina Mangala area, and set down a protocol that provided guarantees for surveying the Aboriginal cultural heritage before any development projects on the land could be undertaken.

Prominent people
Paddy Roe was an Nyigina elder who wrote about Nyigina culture and religion.
Butcher Joe Nangan was a Nyigina Mabanjarra, songman, and artist.

Notes

Citations

Sources

Further reading

Aboriginal peoples of Western Australia
Broome, Western Australia